WISEA J114724.10−204021.3 (abbreviated WISEA 1147) is a brown dwarf in the TW Hydrae association, a nearby group of very young stars and brown dwarfs. The object is notable because its estimate mass, 6±1 times the mass of Jupiter, places it in the mass range for rogue planets. Nevertheless, it is a free-floating object, unassociated with any star system.

The object was discovered using information from NASA's WISE (Wide-field Infrared Survey Explorer) and the 2MASS (Two Micron All-Sky Survey). Researchers inferred the young age for WISEA 1147 because it is a member of a group of stars that is only 10 million years old, and they  estimated its mass using evolutionary models for brown dwarf cooling.

References

Brown dwarfs
Rogue planets
L-type stars
Hydra (constellation)
WISE objects
TW Hydrae association